Bârsău is a commune of 2,424 inhabitants situated in Satu Mare County, Romania. It is composed of two villages, Bârsău de Jos (Alsóberekszó) and Bârsău de Sus (the commune center).

References

Communes in Satu Mare County